Zil Çalınca is the first Turkish series of Disney Channel and the last version of As The Bell Rings.

Characters 
 Metehan (Turhan Cihan Şimşek): Handsome. Girls love Metehan. He can play guitar. He likes rock music.
 Merve (Elif Ceren Balıkçı): Metehan's sister. She is energetic and talkative. She is friends with Acar.
 Ada (Merve Hazer): Hardworking. She is President of the school. She loves Korcan.
 Duygu (Miray Daner): The most beautiful girl. Daughter of a wealthy family, she wants to be an actress.
 Korcan (Emir Çalıkkocaoğlu): Successful student. Korcan's mother and father are university teachers. He loves his mom and dad very much. He helps his friends with homework. He loves Duygu.
 Aslı (Aylin Üskaya): Athletic. She loves soccer. She has short black hair.
 Acar (Lorin Merhart): Genius. His friends call him "glasses" because he can not see without them.
 Tanıl (Berkay Mercan): Loves physics and chemistry. He is the New Einstein.
 Nisan (Yağmur Yılmaz): Loves nature. Her favorite topics are the melting of glaciers, extinction of animals, organic food, the difference between vegetarians and vegans.
 Sarp (Fırat Can Aydın): Playful student who wears funny hats, colorful scarves, and strange-looking sports shoes. He likes Nisan.

Episodes

Series overview

References

Turkish comedy television series
Disney Channels Worldwide original programming
2012 Turkish television series debuts
Turkish-language Disney Channel original programming
Television series produced in Istanbul
Television shows set in Istanbul
Television series set in the 2010s
2010s high school television series
2010s teen sitcoms
Television series about teenagers